Sebaiya is a city in Aswan Governorate, Egypt.

See also
 List of cities and towns in Egypt

Populated places in Aswan Governorate